Velika Kopašnica is a village in the municipality of Leskovac, Serbia. According to the 2002 census, the village has a population of 676 people.

Serbian international football (Association football) goalkeeper Saša Stamenković, current goalkeeper of Neftchi Baku and previously Red Star Belgrade was born in Velika Kopašnica in 1985.

References

Populated places in Jablanica District